Thomas Fitzherbert was an English Jesuit.

Thomas Fitzherbert may also refer to:

Thomas Fitzherbert (MP for Newcastle-under-Lyme), represented Newcastle-under-Lyme in 1593
Thomas Fitzherbert (MP for Staffordshire), represented Staffordshire in 1545–7
Thomas Fitzherbert (Arundel MP) for Arundel 1780–1790
Thomas Fitzherbert (cricketer) (1869–1937), English cricketer